Abner Woodruff Sibal (April 11, 1921 – January 27, 2000) was a member of the United States House of Representatives from Connecticut's 4th congressional district. He served  from 1961 to 1965. He was defeated in 1964. He also served as a member of the Connecticut Senate from 1956 to 1960, and a delegate to the Republican National Convention from Connecticut in 1964.

Biography
Born in Ridgewood, New York, Sibal graduated from Norwalk High School in 1938.  He was in the Wesleyan University, A.B., 1943, and St. John's University School of Law, LL.B., 1949.  He enlisted in the United States Army in March 1943, served in the European and Pacific Theaters of World War II, and was discharged as a first lieutenant in September 1946.

He was admitted to the Connecticut bar in 1949 and to the Federal bar in 1965.  He served as prosecuting attorney in Norwalk City Court from 1951 to 1955, and as corporation counsel for the city of Norwalk from 1959 to 1960.

Sibal began his political career as a member of Connecticut Senate from 1956 to 1960, serving as minority leader the last two years.  He also served as chairman of the Connecticut Commission on Corporation Law in 1959.  He served as delegate to each Connecticut Republican State Convention from 1952 to 1968, and as delegate to Republican National Convention, 1964.

Sibal was elected as a Republican to the Eighty-Seventh and Eighty-Eighth Congresses (January 3, 1961 – January 3, 1965).  He was an unsuccessful candidate for reelection in 1964 to the Eighty-Ninth Congress.  He served as general counsel for the Equal Employment Opportunity Commission from 1975 to 1978, before resuming the private practice of law.  He died in Alexandria, Virginia, on January 27, 2000.

References

External links

 
  Retrieved on 2008-02-05
 

1921 births
2000 deaths
United States Army personnel of World War II
American prosecutors
Connecticut lawyers
Republican Party Connecticut state senators
Politicians from Norwalk, Connecticut
St. John's University School of Law alumni
United States Army officers
Wesleyan University alumni
Republican Party members of the United States House of Representatives from Connecticut
20th-century American lawyers
20th-century American politicians
Norwalk High School (Connecticut) alumni